Daviesia suaveolens is a species of flowering plant in the family Fabaceae and is endemic to south-eastern New South Wales. It is a tree-like shrub or small tree with scattered, narrowly egg-shaped phyllodes with the narrower end towards the base, and yellow flowers, sometimes with faint red markings.

Description

Taxonomy
Daviesia suaveolens was first formally described in 1991 by Michael Crisp in Australian Systematic Botany from specimens he collected near Merricumbene in 1978. The specific epithet (suaveolens) means "fragrant".

Distribution and habitat
This daviesia grows in forest on ridges and slopes on the escarpment between Monga and Bemboka is south-eastern New South Wales.

References

suaveolens
Taxa named by Michael Crisp
Plants described in 1991
Flora of New South Wales